The following article presents a summary of the 2001 football in Paraguay.

First division results

Torneo Apertura
The Apertura tournament was played in a single all-play-all system. At the end, the top eight teams qualified to a playoff stage to determine the Apertura champion.

Apertura playoff stage
The top eight teams qualified to this stage.

Quarterfinals

|}
*Libertad advances to next round due to better position in the Apertura table.

Semifinals

|}

Apertura final

|}

Cerro Porteño wins the Apertura tournament final by an aggregate score of 6-1 on June 24, 2001.

Torneo Clausura
The Clausura tournament was played in a single all-play-all system. At the end, the top eight teams qualified to a playoff stage to determine the Clausura champion.

Clausura playoff stage
The top eight teams qualified to this stage with the exception of Cerro Corá, who was replaced by Olimpia because Cerro Corá was already relegated to the second division based on a three-year average point table.

Quarterfinals

|}
*Libertad advances to next round due to better position in the Apertura table.

Semifinals

|}

Clausura final

|}

Cerro Porteño wins the Clausura tournament final in a penalty shootout.

Championship game playoff
Since Cerro Porteño won both the Apertura and Clausura tournaments they were declared as the national champions and no playoff game was played.

Relegation / Promotion
 Cerro Corá automatically relegated to the second division after finishing last in the average points table based over a three-year period.
Atl. Colegiales finished second-to-last in the aggregate points table, so had to participate in the promotion play-off game against second division runners-up Club Sport Colombia. Sport Colombia won the playoff game by an aggregate score of 5-1, so Colegiales was relegated to the second division.
 Deportivo Recoleta promoted to the first division by winning the second division tournament.

Qualification to international competitions
Cerro Porteño qualified to the 2002 Copa Libertadores by winning the Torneo Apertura and Torneo Clausura.
The remaining two spots for Copa Libertadores were decided in the Pre-Libertadores playoff tournament.

Pre-Libertadores playoff
Six teams participated based on aggregate points during the year. Sportivo Luqueño entered the playoff with three bonus points by winning the runners-up game against Guarani.

Olimpia and 12 de Octubre qualify to the 2002 Copa Libertadores.

Lower divisions results

Paraguayan teams in international competitions
2001 Copa Libertadores:
Cerro Porteño: round of 16
Olimpia: group stage
Guaraní: group stage
Copa MERCOSUR 2001:
Cerro Porteño: quarterfinals
Olimpia: group stage

Paraguay national team

References
 Paraguay 2001 by Eli Schmerler, Andy Bolander and Juan Pablo Andrés at RSSSF
 Diario ABC Color

 
Seasons in Paraguayan football